James Norris (1809 – August 1, 1891) was an Ontario businessman and political figure. He represented Lincoln in the House of Commons of Canada as a Liberal member from 1874 to 1878.

He was born in Argyleshire, Scotland in 1809 and came to Peel County, Upper Canada with his parents around 1834. He moved to St. Catharines, where he formed a partnership with Sylvester Neelon in shipping, milling and the timber trade. After the partnership dissolved, Norris continued to be involved in transporting goods to foreign markets, primarily England. He served on the town council, serving a term as mayor. In 1847, he married Sophronia Neelon, his partner's sister; in 1863, he married Elizabeth Waud, after his first wife's death. He was first elected to the House of Commons in the 1874 federal election but was unseated after an appeal. He won the by-election that followed later that year. Norris resigned his seat in April 1877 and then was reelected in a May 1877 by-election. He ran unsuccessfully for reelection in 1878 and 1882. Norris died in St. Catharines at the age of 71.

References 

1809 births
1891 deaths
Liberal Party of Canada MPs
Members of the House of Commons of Canada from Ontario
Scottish emigrants to pre-Confederation Ontario
Mayors of St. Catharines
Immigrants to Upper Canada